Elections to Erewash District Council were held on 10 May 1973 as part of nationwide local elections. The new district was formed by the merger of the Borough of Ilkeston, the Long Eaton urban district and the parishes of Breadsall, Breaston, Dale Abbey, Draycott and Church Wilne, Hopwell, Little Eaton, Morley, Ockbrook, Risley, Sandiacre, Stanley, Stanton by Dale and West Hallam from the South East Derbyshire Rural District. The new council became a shadow authority before taking over from the existing local authorities on 1 April 1974. The election saw the Labour Party gain control of the Council. Erewash District Council was granted Borough Status in 1975 and from thereon became known as Erewash Borough Council.

Overall results

Erewash Borough Council - Results by Ward
Source:

Breadsall and Morley

Breaston

Dale Abbey

Draycott

Ilkeston Granby

Ilkeston Market

Ilkeston North

Ilkeston South

Ilkeston Victoria

Little Eaton

Long Eaton Derby Road

Long Eaton New Sawley

Long Eaton Nottingham Road and Sawley Road

Ockbrook and Borrowash

Old Park

Sandiacre

Stanley

West Hallam

References

1973
1973 English local elections
1970s in Derbyshire